Iryna Sushko (born 1967) is a Ukrainian mathematician who works as a senior research fellow in the Institute of Mathematics of the National Academy of Sciences of Ukraine and as a visiting professor at the Kyiv School of Economics. Her research concerns nonlinear dynamical systems and their applications in economics and radio engineering.

Education and career
Sushko was born in 1967, near Kyiv. She earned a master's degree in cybernetics from the Taras Shevchenko National University of Kyiv in 1989. After postgraduate study at the National Academy of Sciences of Ukraine, she earned a candidate (PhD) degree in phyics and mathematics in 1993, supervised by Oleksandr Mykolayovych Sharkovsky. She became a research fellow at the National Academy of Sciences in 1993 and was promoted to senior research fellow in 2002.

In 2004–2005 she visited the University of Urbino as a Marie Curie Fellow of the European Community. Since 2009 to 2020 she has also held a position as a visiting professor at the Kyiv School of Economics.

Books
Sushko is the co-author of Continuous and Discontinuous Piecewise-Smooth One-Dimensional Maps: Invariant Sets and Bifurcation Structures (with Viktor Avrutin, Laura Gardini, and Fabio Tramontana, World Scientific, 2019)

She is also a co-editor of several edited volumes, including Oligopoly and Complex Dynamics: Models and Tools (Springer, 2002), Business Cycle Dynamics: Models and Tools (Springer, 2006), and Global Analysis of Dynamic Models for Economics, Finance and Social Sciences (Springer, 2013).

References

External links
Personal home page
Home page at Kyiv School of Economics

1967 births
Living people
Ukrainian women mathematicians
Ukrainian women economists
Taras Shevchenko National University of Kyiv alumni
20th-century Ukrainian mathematicians
20th-century women mathematicians
20th-century Ukrainian economists
21st-century Ukrainian mathematicians
21st-century women mathematicians
21st-century Ukrainian economists